Baselios Marthoma Mathews English Medium School (B.M.M E.M.S) is an elementary cum high school situated in Pampady, Kottayam district, Kerala, India.

History 
The School was founded in 1983 by the Malankara Orthodox Church.

External links
http://bmmschoolpampady.com/

References

Primary schools in Kerala
Schools in Kottayam district
1983 establishments in Kerala
Educational institutions established in 1983